Tereso Medina Ramírez (born 15 October 1962) is a Mexican politician from the Institutional Revolutionary Party. From 2009 to 2012 he served as Deputy of the LXI Legislature of the Mexican Congress representing Coahuila, and previously served in the Congress of Coahuila.

References

1962 births
Living people
Politicians from Torreón
Institutional Revolutionary Party politicians
20th-century Mexican politicians
21st-century Mexican politicians
Members of the Congress of Coahuila
Deputies of the LXI Legislature of Mexico
Members of the Chamber of Deputies (Mexico) for Coahuila
Members of the Senate of the Republic (Mexico) for Coahuila